Barabanki Junction or Barabanki station is the intercity rail station and a commuter rail hub in the Indian city of Barabanki. It has been important junction since the days of British control of India. In its category it is one of the important stations in NER. The Barabanki Junction railway station is on the Delhi– Basti– Gorakhpur main broad-gauge route in Uttar Pradesh. Barabanki Junction is also the hub for the Barabanki–Lucknow Suburban Railway. Barabanki railway station lies in the zone of high density stations.

History
The station became operational on 1 April 1872 with the opening of Burhwal-Barabanki section. It got connected to Lucknow on 24 November 1896 with the opening of Daliganj-Barabanki section. The station underwent major renovation in 1940s.

Of the 301 miles of the Bengal and North Western Railway main line was 17 miles consisting of following section which was used to connect Barabanki from Burhwal:
 Burwhal–Barabanki line (17 miles)
 Burhwal to Barabanki (broad gauge) opened 1 April 1872
 Burhwal to Barabanki (broad to mixed gauge) converted 24 November 1896
 Burhwal to Barabanki (mixed to metre gauge) converted around 1943

18 miles of the Cawnpore–Burhwal Railway which was later renamed as Cawnpore–Barabanki Railway, was used to connect Barabanki from Daliganj:
 Daliganj–Barabanki line (18 miles)
 Daliganj to Barabanki (metre gauge) opened 24 November 1896

In 1981 Railway Budget two enhancements related to Barabanki were proposed:
 Northern Railway Budget section,
 Barabanki–Lucknow section: additional broad-gauge line and other connected works
 North Eastern Railway,
 Barabanki–Samastipur section: conversion of metre-gauge section via Muzzafarpur into broad gauge outside station parking stand.

Electrification
Electrification of tracks at Barabanki Jn took place in two phases spread across span of almost ten years.

Phase I
Phase I of electrification of tracks passing through Barabanki Jn took place in 2002–03 in two steps,
Step 1 – Safedabad–Barabanki
Electrification of tracks between Safedabad railway station and Barabanki Jn was completed on 29 September 2002.
Step 2 – Barabanki Yard
Electrification of tracks at Barabanki Yard was completed on 29 March 2003.

Phase II
Phase II of electrification of 30 km of tracks from Barabanki Jn to Burhwal Jn (section of Gorakhpur–Lucknow route) took place in 2010–11 and got completed in May 2011.

Goods yard
Barabanki station has two yards: one at Faizabad route side and other at Gorakhpur route side. This yard used for load and unload purpose of commodities mainly coal, fertilizer, cement, stone, food grains etc.

Routes from Barabanki Junction

 Lucknow Jn → Barabanki Jn → Gonda Jn (Cawnpore–Burhwal Railway)
 Lucknow → Barabanki Jn → Faizabad Jn (Cawnpore–Barabanki Railway)
 Barabanki Jn → Barabanki Sugar Mill → Barabanki FCI (Nawabganj Sugar Factory Railway)

Trains originating & terminating at Barabanki Junction
Total 5 EMUs/DMUs originate from Barabanki Junction railway station, same number of EMUs/DMUs terminate too at the station.

Trains passing through Barabanki Junction

Daily 125 trains pass through Barabanki Junction. Normally around six thousand passengers pass through this railway station, this number can be higher on special occasions e.g. during season of Kumbh Mela 2013, on 7, 8 and 9 February 2013, 8500, 8700 and 8000 passengers travelled from Barabanki to Lucknow railway station to catch trains for Allahabad as there is no direct train from Barabanki to Allahabad.

Gallery

See also
Indian Railways
Barabanki–Lucknow Suburban Railway
Lucknow–Kanpur Suburban Railway
Cawnpore–Burhwal Railway
Cawnpore–Barabanki Railway

References

External links
घोषणाओं का पुलिंदा ढो रहा बाराबंकी जंक्शन (in Hindi), Dainik Jagran, 22 Feb 2012

Railway junction stations in Uttar Pradesh
Railway stations in Barabanki district
Transport in Barabanki, Uttar Pradesh
Railway stations opened in 1872
1872 establishments in British India
Lucknow NR railway division